Perinaldo is a comune (municipality) in the Province of Imperia in the Italian region Liguria, located about  southwest of Genoa and about  west of Imperia.

It is the birthplace of the 17th-century Italian naturalised French astronomer Giovanni Domenico Cassini.

Main sights
Parish church of San Nicola da Bari, built in 1489. It houses a 15th-century wooden crucifix.
Church of Sant'Antonio abate (1590–1600)
Sanctuary of the Visitation (17th century)
Astronomical observatory

Twin towns
 Tourves, France, since 1993 
 Buey Arriba, Cuba

References

External links
 Official website

Cities and towns in Liguria